Herbert Adolf Cahn (28 January 1915, Frankfurt am Main – 5 April 2002, Basel) was a classical archaeologist, numismatist, coin-dealer and antiquities-dealer. He was awarded the medal of the Royal Numismatic Society in 1971. Born in Germany, he became a Swiss citizen in 1949.

References

External sources 
Literature by and about Herbert Cahn at the Deutsche National Bibliotek (in German)

1915 births
2002 deaths
German classical scholars
German numismatists
Archaeologists from Frankfurt
Swiss archaeologists
20th-century archaeologists